The Better Medicare Alliance  (BMA) is an American 501(c)(4) advocacy and research group that supports Medicare Advantage, a private health insurance option available to Medicare beneficiaries. The organization is funded by the insurance companies UnitedHealthcare, Aetna, and Humana, and has been criticized as a front group for the health insurance industry.

BMA was founded in December 2014 by thirteen coalition partners, including Aetna, Humana, UnitedHealth Group, the American Medical Group Association, the Healthcare Leadership Council, Healthways, the National Association of Manufacturers, the National Retail Federation, and the U.S. Chamber of Commerce. BMA has over 100 organizations listed as allies, including Meals on Wheels America.

In early 2015, the group strongly opposed the rate decrease proposed by the Centers for Medicare and Medicaid Services (CMS) for Medicare Advantage, arguing that access to the program in rural areas had been declining. It was joined by over 300 members of Congress who wrote to CMS to oppose the cuts, which eventually went into effect. In April 2015, former U.S. Representative Allyson Young Schwartz was named president and CEO of the organization. Schwartz was considered a leading health care expert in Congress, and received over $2.1 million in campaign contributions from the healthcare sector during her congressional career.

References

501(c)(4) nonprofit organizations
Medicare and Medicaid (United States)